Komi Sje (Ԍ ԍ; italics: Ԍ ԍ) is a letter of the Molodtsov alphabet, a version of the Cyrillic alphabet that was used to write the Komi language in the 1920s. It represented the voiceless alveolo-palatal sibilant . Some of its forms are similar to the  Latin letter G (G g G g).

Computing codes

See also 
С́ с́ : Cyrillic letter Sje
С с : Cyrillic letter Es
Cyrillic characters in Unicode

Cyrillic letters
Permic languages